Eino Kauno Sandelin (December 16, 1864 – October 15, 1937) was a Finnish sailor who competed in the 1912 Summer Olympics. He was a crew member of the Finnish boat Heatherbell, which won the bronze medal in the 12 metre class.

References

External links
profile

1864 births
1937 deaths
Finnish male sailors (sport)
Sailors at the 1912 Summer Olympics – 12 Metre
Olympic sailors of Finland
Olympic bronze medalists for Finland
Olympic medalists in sailing
Medalists at the 1912 Summer Olympics
20th-century Finnish people